Blenheim Central is the central suburb and central business district of Blenheim, in the Marlborough region of the South Island of New Zealand. The central park, Seymour Square, contains a clock tower and war memorial fountain.

Demographics

Blenheim Central had a population of 1,152 at the 2018 New Zealand census, an increase of 84 people (7.9%) since the 2013 census, and an increase of 42 people (3.8%) since the 2006 census. There were 453 households. There were 606 males and 543 females, giving a sex ratio of 1.12 males per female. The median age was 37.1 years (compared with 37.4 years nationally), with 168 people (14.6%) aged under 15 years, 276 (24.0%) aged 15 to 29, 522 (45.3%) aged 30 to 64, and 183 (15.9%) aged 65 or older.

Ethnicities were 81.0% European/Pākehā, 17.7% Māori, 4.2% Pacific peoples, 5.7% Asian, and 4.2% other ethnicities (totals add to more than 100% since people could identify with multiple ethnicities).

The proportion of people born overseas was 19.8%, compared with 27.1% nationally.

Although some people objected to giving their religion, 54.4% had no religion, 31.2% were Christian, 1.3% were Hindu, 0.3% were Muslim, 0.8% were Buddhist and 3.9% had other religions.

Of those at least 15 years old, 96 (9.8%) people had a bachelor or higher degree, and 240 (24.4%) people had no formal qualifications. The median income was $28,800, compared with $31,800 nationally. The employment status of those at least 15 was that 528 (53.7%) people were employed full-time, 159 (16.2%) were part-time, and 42 (4.3%) were unemployed.

Education
Blenheim School is a coeducational contributing primary school (years 1-6) with a roll of  students.

Marlborough Boys' College is a single-sex secondary school (years 9–13) with a roll of  students.

St Mary's School is a state-integrated Catholic primary school (years 1-8) with a roll of  students.

Rolls are as of

References

Suburbs of Blenheim, New Zealand
Populated places in the Marlborough Region
Central business districts in New Zealand